1982 JSL Cup Final was the seventh final of the JSL Cup competition. The final was played at Kusanagi Athletic Stadium in Shizuoka on August 30, 1982. Furukawa Electric won the championship.

Overview
Furukawa Electric won their 2nd title, by defeating Yanmar Diesel 3–2.

Match details

See also
1982 JSL Cup

References

JSL Cup
1982 in Japanese football
JEF United Chiba matches
Cerezo Osaka matches